Far from Bashar is a Canadian documentary film, directed by Pascal Sanchez and released in 2020. The film profiles Adnan al-Mahamied and Basmah Issa, a married couple from Syria who have been living in Montreal since moving to Canada as refugees after participating in the uprisings against Syrian president Bashar al-Assad.

The film premiered on September 25, 2020, at the Cinémathèque québécoise.

It received a Prix Iris nomination for the Prix Iris Public Prize at the 23rd Quebec Cinema Awards in 2021.

References

External links

2020 films
2020 documentary films
Canadian documentary films
Documentary films about refugees
2020s Canadian films